Tommy Robredo was the defending champion, but decided no to participate.

Filippo Volandri won the final against Andrej Martin 6–3, 6–2.

Seeds

Draw

Finals

Top half

Bottom half

References
 Main Draw
 Qualifying Draw

Aspria Tennis Cup - Trofeo CDI - Singles
2013 - Singles